Sabonje is a village southwest of  Ilirska Bistrica in the Inner Carniola region of Slovenia.

Unmarked grave
Sabonje is the site of an unmarked grave from the end of the Second World War. The Podbeže No. 40 Grave lies under a walnut tree opposite the house at Podbeže no. 40. It contains the remains of a German soldier from the 97th Corps that fell at the beginning of May 1945.

Church
The local church in the settlement is dedicated to Saint Martin and belongs to the Parish of Podgrad.

References

External links

Sabonje on Geopedia

Populated places in the Municipality of Ilirska Bistrica